The following is a list of geographic names denoting the concept of peace, in their respective language.

Languages in this list

 makmur – Arabic (’tranquility’)
 salaam – Arabic
 安平 – Chinese, Mandarin (an’ping) or 平安 (ping’an) or simply 安 (an)
 长安 – Chinese, Mandarin (chang’an, eternal peace)
 和平 – Chinese, Mandarin (he’ping) or 平和 (ping’he)
 安 – Chinese, Teochew & Cantonese (on)
 fred – Danish and Swedish
 peace – English
 paix – French
 Frieden – German
 shalom – Hebrew
 béke – Hungarian (cf. békés ’peaceful’)
 平安 – Japanese (hei’an)
 平和 – Japanese (heiwa)
 sentosa – Malay 
 aman - Malay
 paz - Portuguese and Spanish
 Shanti, shanthi, santi from Sanskrit 
 mir, myr – Russian, Ukrainian
 สันติภาพ, สันติ (santiphap, santi) – Thai and Lao
 an bình – Vietnamese equivalent of Chinese an’ping
 hòa bình – Vietnamese equivalent of Chinese he’ping

List

Argentina

 La Paz, Córdoba
 La Paz, Entre Ríos
 La Paz, Mendoza
 La Paz Department, Catamarca
 La Paz Department, Mendoza

Bolivia

 La Paz, administrative capital of Bolivia
 La Paz Department (Bolivia)
 La Paz Municipality, Bolivia
 La Paz River

Brunei
 Brunei Darussalam - 'Abode of Peace', long name of country

Canada
Friedensruh, province of Manitoba, Canada 
International Peace Garden, Manitoba, Canada
 Municipal District of Peace No. 135
Peace Dale, village in S. Kingston, Canada
 Peace River
 Peace River Block
 Peace River Country
 Peace River Regional District
 Salem, Ontario
 Waterton-Glacier International Peace Park, Alberta

China, PRC
 安海镇 Anhai Town, Quanzhou city
Anping County, of Hengshui, Hebei
Anping, Cenxi, in Cenxi City, Guangxi
Anping, Anping County, in Anping County, Hebei
Anping, Xianghe County, in Xianghe County, Hebei
Anping, Zhecheng County, in Zhecheng County, Henan
Anping, Anren County, in Anren County, Hunan
Anping, Lianyuan, in Lianyuan City, Hunan
 安平桥 Anping Bridge, Quanzhou city
Beijing (formerly Beiping 北平, or 'Northern Peace')
 Chang'an Avenue, a major east-west thoroughfare in Beijing
 Chang'an District, Shijiazhuang, Hebei
 Chang'an District, Xi'an, Shaanxi
 Chang'an Subdistrict, Mudanjiang, in Dong'an District, Mudanjiang, Heilongjiang
 Chang'an Subdistrict, Linxiang, Hunan, in Linxiang City, Hunan
 Chang'an Subdistrict, Wuxi, in Huishan District, Wuxi, Jiangsu
 Chang'an Subdistrict, Jiaohe, in Jiaohe City, Jilin
 Chang'an Subdistrict, Shenyang, in Dadong District, Shenyang, Liaoning
 Chang'an Subdistrict, Xichang, in Xichang City, Sichuan
 Chang'an Township, Gansu, in Ganzhou District, Zhangye
 Chang'an Township, Guizhou, in Huishui County
 Chang'an Township, Hunan, in Hengyang County
 Chang'an Township, Linshui County, in Linshui County, Sichuan
 Chang'an Township, Luzhou, in Longmatan District, Luzhou, Sichuan
Chang'an, Anhui, in Jixi County
Chang'an, Dongguan, Guangdong
Chang'an, Fengkai County, in Fengkai County, Guangdong
Chang'an, Guangxi, in Rong'an County, Guangxi
Chang'an, Dandong, in Donggang, Liaoning
Chang'an, Pingli County, in Pingli County, Shaanxi
Chang'an, Haining, in Haining City, Zhejiang
Chang'an, Hangzhou, in Fuyang District, Hangzhou, Zhejiang
 Heping District, Tianjin (和平区)
 Heping District, Shenyang (和平区), Liaoning
 Heping County (和平县), of Heyuan, Guangdong
 Heping Subdistrict (和平街道)
 Heping Subdistrict, Shaoguan, in Zhenjiang District, Shaoguan, Guangdong
 Heping Subdistrict, Gaobeidian, Hebei
 Heping Subdistrict, Handan, in Congtai District, Handan, Hebei
 Heping Subdistrict, Wuhan, in Hongshan District, Wuhan, Hubei
 Heping Subdistrict, Baotou, in Donghe District, Baotou, Inner Mongolia
 Heping Subdistrict, Ulan Hot, Inner Mongolia
 Heping Subdistrict, Xuzhou, in Quanshan District, Xuzhou, Jiangsu
 Heping Subdistrict, Meihekou, Jilin
 Heping Subdistrict, Anshan City, in Tiedong District, Anshan, Liaoning
 Heping Subdistrict, Fushun, in Wanghua District, Fushun, Liaoning
 Heping Subdistrict, Fuxin, in Haizhou District, Fuxin, Liaoning
 Heping Subdistrict, Zibo, in Zhangdian District, Zibo, Shandong
 Heping Subdistrict, Taiyuan, in Wanbailin District, Taiyuan, Shanxi
 Heping Subdistrict, Tacheng, Xinjiang
 Towns named (和平镇)
 Heping, Shaowu, Fujian
 Heping, Zhangping, Fujian
 Heping, Wuwei, in Liangzhou District, Wuwei, Gansu
 Heping, Yuzhong County, Gansu
 Heping, Shantou, in Chaoyang District, Shantou, Guangdong
 Heping, Teng County, Guangxi
 Heping, Huishui County, Guizhou
 Heping, Yanhe County, in Yanhe Tujia Autonomous County, Guizhou
 Heping, Qiongzhong County, in Qiongzhong Li and Miao Autonomous County, Hainan
 Heping, Tailai County, Heilongjiang
 Heping, Wudalianchi, Heilongjiang
 Heping, Guiyang County, Hunan
 Heping, Huai'an, in Qingpu District, Huai'an, Jiangsu
 Heping, Fenxi County, Shanxi
 Heping, Changxing County, Zhejiang
 Heping Township (和平乡)
 Heping Township, Yuexi County, Anhui
 Heping Township, Longxi County, Gansu
 Heping Township, Longsheng County, in Longsheng Various Nationalities Autonomous County, Guangxi
 Heping Township, Sanjiang County, in Sanjiang Dong Autonomous County, Guangxi
 Heping Township, Tongren City, Guizhou
 Heping Township, Zhaoyuan County, Heilongjiang
 Heping Township, Hengyang, in Zhuhui District, Hengyang, Hunan
 Heping Township, Faku County, Liaoning
 Heping Township, Huangyuan County, Qinghai
 Heping Township, Anyue County, Sichuan
 Heping Township, Nanjiang County, Sichuan
 Heping Township, Xinlong County, Sichuan
 Heping Township, Zigong, in Da'an District, Zigong, Sichuan
 Heping Township, Yunxiao County, Zhejiang
Ping'an Avenue (平安街), major through route in Beijing, China
Ping'an County (平安县), in Qinghai Province, China
Ping'an, Lanzhou, in Honggu District, Lanzhou, Gansu
Ping'an, Qing'an County, in Heilongjiang
Ping'an, Baicheng, in Taobei District, Baicheng, Jilin
Ping'an, Shulan, in Jilin
Ping'an, Ping'an County, in Qinghai
Ping'an Township (平安乡), name of several townships in China
Ping'an Township, Fengjie County, in Chongqing
Ping'an Township, Pengshui County, in Chongqing
Ping'an Township, Zhangjiachuan County, in Zhangjiachuan Hui Autonomous County, Tianshui, Gansu
Ping'an Township, Gongcheng County, in Guilin
Ping'an Township, Jiamusi, in Jiao District, Jiamusi, Heilongjiang
Ping'an Township, Hure Banner, in Tongliao, Inner Mongolia
Ping'an Township, Dawa County, in Liaoning
Ping'an Township, Zhangwu County, in Liaoning
Ping'an Township, Yuechi County, in Guang'an, Sichuan
 Pinghe County
 Shanghai Pinghe School
 西安 Xi'an (literally, western peace; old name 长安 = everlasting peace)

Colombia

 La Paz, Cesar
 La Paz, Santander

Costa Rica

 La Paz Waterfall, Costa Rica
 University for Peace, San Jose, CR

Cyprus

Bellapais

Denmark
 Fredensborg
 Fredensborg Palace
 Fredensdal, a house

Egypt
 Al Salam Bridge; see Suez Canal Bridge

El Salvador

 La Paz Department (El Salvador)
 La Paz, La Paz Department

Germany
Friedeburg in East Frisia, a city in the Frisian region of Germany
Friedeburg upon Saale, state of Saxony-Anhalt, Germany 
Friedenau, a locality of the city-state of Berlin, Germany
Friedensdorf, state of Saxony-Anhalt, Germany
 Salem, Baden-Württemberg
 Salem Abbey (Reichskloster Salem), a monastery
 Schule Schloss Salem, Germany (also referred to as Salem College, with a section called Salem International College)
 Salem, Schleswig-Holstein

Haiti
Port-de-Paix, Haiti

Honduras
 La Paz, Honduras
 La Paz Department (Honduras)

Hungary
 Békés County
 its seat, Békéscsaba city
 cities and towns in this county: Békés, Békéssámson, Békésszentandrás
 geographical names related to this county: Békési-hát, Békési-sík

Note that another county in Hungary (approx. 30 mi northeast of Békés) has a name with a quasi-opposite meaning, Heves, i.e. ’vehement.’

India

 Shantipur, Nadia District, West Bengal
 Santipur (community development block), Nadia District, West Bengal
 Shantipuri Tanda Range, Uttarakhand
 Shanthipuram a town in Andhra Pradesh - from Shanthi 'peace' in Sanskrit.
 Santhipuram mandal, Chitoor District, Andhra Pradesh

Indonesia
 Province of Aceh, former full name Nanggroe Aceh Darussalam

Iran
 Salam, Chaharmahal and Bakhtiari, Iran

Israel, Palestine
 Jerusalem (Y-R-V = foundation, Sh-L-M = peace), Hebrew
 Kerem Shalom, means vineyard of peace in Hebrew
 Salem, alternate official spelling of Salim, Nablus
 Shaqib al-Salam \ Segev Shalom
 Wahat al-Salam – Neve Shalom, means oasis of peace in Arabic and Hebrew

Japan
 平和の森公園 Heiwanomori Park - Peace Forest Park, Tokyo
 平和島駅 Heiwajima Station (railway), Tokyo
 広島平和記念公園 Hiroshima Peace Memorial Park, Hiroshima City
 Kyoto City, (known in classical times as 平安京 Heian'kyo = 'Capital of Peace')
 平和公園 Heiwa Park, Nagasaki Peace Park
 平和通り Heiwa Dori, 'Peace Avenue', Naha, Okinawa
 平和台駅, Heiwadai Station (Railway), Tokyo 
 Nara City, (known in classical times as 平城京　Heijo'kyo = 'Capital Fortress of Peace')

Malaysia
 Pahang state, Darul Makmur 'Abode of Tranquility' in Arabic
 Bukit Aman, 'Peace Hill', Malaysian Police headquarters district in Kuala Lumpur
 Aman Jaya, Sungai Petani, Kedah Malaysia 'Victory of Peace' in Malay

Mali
 Salam, Mali

Mexico

 La Paz, Baja California Sur
 La Paz Municipality, Baja California Sur
 La Paz, State of Mexico, a large suburb of Mexico City

North Korea
Hwapyong County, cognate of Chinese He’ping
Pyongan Province, North Korea (평안 = 平安 meaning peace)
Pyongyang, 평양 derived from 平壤, Peaceful Land (once formerly Chang’an; or 'eternal peace')

Philippines

 La Paz, Abra
 La Paz, Agusan del Sur
 La Paz, Iloilo City, a district of Iloilo City
 La Paz, Leyte
 La Paz, Tarlac

Portugal
Beja, Portugal (from Latin Pax Julia via Arabic Baja)

Singapore
 Sentosa island, from Malay 'peace'

South Africa
 Ekurhuleni (also known as the East Rand) – from Tsonga "place of peace".
 Liefde en Vrede, suburb of Johannesburg, Gauteng – from Afrikaans "vrede"
 Peace Haven, suburb of Randfontein, Gauteng
 Peace Heights, suburb of Sebokeng, Gauteng
 Peacehaven, suburb of Pietermaritzburg, KwaZulu-Natal
 Peacehaven, suburb of Vereeniging, Gauteng
 Peacevale, KwaZulu-Natal
 Salem, Eastern Cape
 Salem, suburb of Hillcrest, KwaZulu-Natal
 Vrede, Free State
 Vrededorp, suburb of Johannesburg, Gauteng
 Vredefort, Free State
 Vredehoek, suburb of Cape Town, Western Cape
 Vredekloof, suburb of Brackenfell, Western Cape
 Vredelust, suburb of Bellville, Western Cape
 Vredenburg, Western Cape
 Vredendal, Western Cape
 Vredepark, suburb of Johannesburg, Gauteng
 Weltevredenpark, suburb of Roodepoort, Gauteng

Spain
Badajoz, Spain (from Civitas Pacis, "town of peace" via Arabic)
 Salem, Valencia

Sri Lanka
 Shanthipura, Nuwara Eliya, Sri Lanka from Sanskrit 'Shanti' meaning peace

Sweden 
 Fredhällsbron, a bridge in Stockholm
 Salem Municipality
 Salem, Sweden, the seat of Salem Municipality

Taiwan, ROC
 二二八和平紀念公園, 228 Peace Memorial Park, Taipei
 安平镇, An-pêng, town in Tainan City, Taiwan
 安平區, An-pêng district of Tainan City
Anping Port (安平港), in Tainan
Fort Zeelandia (Taiwan), or Fort Anping (安平古堡), the oldest colonial fortress in Taiwan
Heping District, Taichung (和平區)
Pingzhen District, district in Taoyuan City, formerly the town of Anping

Tanzania
 Dar-es-Salaam - Abode of Peace, Arabic

Thailand
 สวนสันติภาพ Santiphap Park, Bangkok
 On On Hotel, 安安, Phuket (Teochew)
 Santi Suk District of Nan Province.

United Kingdom
 Peacehaven, East Sussex
Salem, Cornwall
 Salem, Greater Manchester, within Oldham, England
 Salem, village near Llandeilo, Wales
 Salem, above Penrhyn-coch, Wales
Dunipace, Scotland (Hills of peace)

United States
Echota, the old center of the Cherokee nation
 International Peace Garden, North Dakota
 La Paz County, Arizona
 La Paz, Arizona, a ghost town
 La Paz, California, headquarters of the United Farm Workers
 La Paz, Indiana
 Friedenburg, Perry County, Missouri
Friedensburg, Pennsylvania
North Dakota, deemed Peace Garden State
Pacific, Missouri
Peacefield, the former home of presidents John Adams and John Quincy Adams
 Peace River, small river in south-central Florida
 On Lok Lifeways (Peace and Happiness in Cantonese), a senior health center in San Jose, California
 Salem, Alabama
 Salem, Fulton County, Arkansas, a city
 Salem, Saline County, Arkansas, a census-designated place
 Salem, Connecticut
 Salem, Florida
 Salem, Georgia
 Salem, Idaho, non-CDP community that straddles Fremont and Madison counties
 Salem, Illinois
 Salem, Adams County, Indiana, unincorporated place
 Salem, Jay County, Indiana, unincorporated place
 Salem, Union County, Indiana, unincorporated place
 Salem, Washington County, Indiana, city
 Salem, Iowa
 Salem, Kentucky
 Salem, Maryland
 Salem, Massachusetts
 Salem Maritime National Historic Site
 Salem witch trials
 Salem Harbor
 Salem Sound, a body of water
 Salem Channel, a part of the Salem Sound
 Salem (MBTA station)
 Salem Township, Washtenaw County, Michigan
 Salem, Missouri
 Salem, Nebraska
 Salem, New Hampshire
 Salem, New Jersey
 Salem Nuclear Power Plant
 Salem River, a tributary of the Delaware River
 Port of Salem
 Salem, New Mexico
 Salem, New York, town in Washington County
 Salem (village), New York, within the town of Salem
 Salem, an earlier name of Brocton, New York, in Chautauqua County
 Salem, North Carolina, census-designated place in Burke County
 Winston-Salem, North Carolina, in Forsyth County
 Old Salem, a history museum in Winston-Salem
 Salem, Ohio
 Salem, Oklahoma
 Salem, Oregon, the state capital
 Salem Metropolitan Statistical Area
 Salem (Amtrak station), a railroad station
 Salem, Pennsylvania, four different unincorporated places
 Salem, South Carolina
 Salem, South Dakota
 Salem, Texas, eight different unincorporated places
 Salem, Utah
 Salem, Virginia, an independent city adjacent to Roanoke
 Salem, Virginia Beach, Virginia, a neighborhood
 Salem, West Virginia, a city in Harrison County
 Salem, Fayette County, West Virginia, an unincorporated community
 Salem, Wisconsin (disambiguation), several places in Wisconsin
 Waterton-Glacier International Peace Park, Montana

Ukraine
Myrhorod, city in Poltava Oblast, Ukraine (means Peace City)
Myrnohrad, city in Donetsk Oblast, Ukraine (means Peace City)
Zhytomyr, city in Zhytomyr Oblast, Ukraine (means Peace of the tribe Zhytychi (part of the Drevlians) or rye (as a corn for living) and peace)
 there are 58 villages as Myrne (means Peace settlement) in 21 oblasts in Ukraine

Uruguay
 La Paz, Uruguay in the Canelones Department

Vietnam
An Bình, Vietnam
Hòa Bình, Hòa Bình Province, Vietnam
Hội An (會安) translates as "peaceful meeting place".

Other
 Pacific Ocean
Mare Tranquillitatis (Sea of Tranquility), on the Moon
Mir Space Station

List of places indirectly named after peace
Islamabad, Pakistan
Pacifica, California 	 
Pacific Beach, San Diego 	 
Pacific Beach, Washington 	 
Pacific City, Oregon 	 
Pacific Grove, California
Pacific Heights, California 	 
Pacific Palisades, Los Angeles
Solomon Islands
Hanoi formerly Tống Bình (宋平, "Song peace") and Tràng An (long peace)

See also
Peace
Š-L-M

References

Peace place names